XEEW-AM is a radio station in Matamoros, Tamaulipas, Mexico, operated by RadioDual. It is known as W1420 and carries a talk radio and romantic format.

History
The station received its concession on August 31, 1954.

References

External links

1954 establishments in Mexico
News and talk radio stations in Mexico
Radio stations established in 1954
Radio stations in Matamoros, Tamaulipas
Spanish-language radio stations